Home for the Holidays was recorded during the Mormon Tabernacle Choir's 2012 Christmas shows in the LDS Conference Center, with special guests English tenor Alfie Boe, former NBC News anchor Tom Brokaw, and Retired Col. Gail Halvorsen aka "Candy Bomber".  An album and concert DVD were released on October 15, 2013 along with a companion book titled Christmas from Heaven: The Story of the Berlin Candy Bomber. The recorded concert will be broadcast on PBS premiering December 10, 2013.  The Salt Lake Tribune said concerning this performance that "this year's edition may have topped them all."

Track listing

The DVD and Blu-ray disc version also include tracks of a reading of Luke 2 by Tom Brokaw (2:24 in length) and Christmas From Heaven by Brokaw and Halvorsen (13:22 in length).

Charts

Year-end charts

References

Tabernacle Choir albums
2013 Christmas albums
Christmas albums by American artists
Live Christmas albums